The Fires of Vulcan is a Big Finish Productions audio drama based on the long-running British science fiction television series Doctor Who.

Plot
The Seventh Doctor and Mel visit ancient Pompeii just before the Vesuvius tragedy is due to occur.

Cast
The Doctor — Sylvester McCoy
Mel — Bonnie Langford
Professor Scalini — Anthony Keetch
Captain Muriel Frost — Karen Henson
Tibernus — Robert Curbishley
Popidus Celsinus — Andy Coleman
Valeria Hedone — Nicky Goldie
Murranus — Steven Wickham
Eumanchia — Lisa Hollander
Aglae — Gemma Bissix
Priest — Toby Longworth
Roman Legionary — Robert Curbishley

External links
Big Finish Productions – The Fires of Vulcan

Seventh Doctor audio plays
2000 audio plays
Pompeii in popular culture
UNIT audio plays
Works by Steve Lyons